The 1976 Army Cadets football team represented the United States Military Academy during the 1976 NCAA Division I football season.

Schedule

Personnel

Season summary

Lafayette

Holy Cross

North Carolina

Stanford

at Penn State

at Tulane

Boston College

Air Force

at Pittsburgh

Colgate

vs. Navy

References

Army
Army Black Knights football seasons
Army Cadets football